Polyptoton  is the stylistic scheme in which words derived from the same root are repeated (such as "strong" and "strength"). A related stylistic device is antanaclasis, in which the same word is repeated, but each time with a different sense. Another related term is figura etymologica.

Other definition 
In inflected languages polyptoton is the same word being repeated but appearing each time in a different case. (for example, "Iuppiter", "Iovis", "Iovi", "Iovem", "Iove" [in Latin being the nominative, genitive, dative, accusative, and ablative forms of "Iuppiter" (the god Jupiter), respectively]).

Genesis 
The form is relatively common in Latin Christian poetry and prose in a construction called the superlative genitive, in phrases such as sanctum sanctorum ("holy of holies"), and found its way into languages such as Old English, which naturally preferred the prevalent alliteration that is part and parcel of polyptoton—in fact, polyptoton is "much more prevalent in Old English verse than in Latin verse." The specific superlative genitive in Old English, however, occurs only in Latinate Christian poems, not in secular poetry.

Historical instances and usages 
It is also used in public speaking, and several examples can be found in Churchill's speeches. 

G. K. Chesterton frequently employed this device to create paradox: 

In combination with verbal active and passive voices, it points out the idea of a latent reciprocity:

An alternative way to use the device is to develop polyptoton over the course of an entire novel, which is done in Mary Shelley's Frankenstein. Shelley combines polyptoton with periphrastic naming, which is the technique of referring to someone using several indirect names. The creature in Frankenstein is referred to by many terms, such as "fiend", "devil", "being", and "ogre". However, the first term that Shelley uses in reference to the creature is "wretch". Throughout the novel, various forms of this are used, such as "wretchedly" and "wretchedness", which may be seen as polyptoton.  According to Duyfhuizen, the gradual development of polyptoton in Frankenstein is significant because it symbolizes the intricacies of one's own identity.

Examples
 "The Greeks are strong, and skillful to their strength / Fierce to their skill, and to their fierceness valiant" — William Shakespeare, Troilus and Cressida I, i, 7-8
  "Preach ye not, they preach." — 
 "With eager feeding food doth choke the feeder." — William Shakespeare Richard II II,i,37
 "Not as a call to battle, though embattled we are." — John F. Kennedy, Inaugural Address, January 20, 1961.
 "Thou art of blood, joy not to make things bleed." — Sir Philip Sidney
 "Absolute power corrupts absolutely." — Lord Acton
 "Who shall watch the watchmen themselves (Quis custodiet ipsos custodes?)?" — Juvenal
 "Diamond me no diamonds, prize me no prizes…" — Alfred, Lord Tennyson, Lancelot and Elaine
 "The healthy man does not torture others—generally it is the tortured who turn into torturers." — Carl Jung

See also
 Antanaclasis
 Figura etymologica
 Cognate object
 Figure of speech
 Rhetoric

References

Sources
 Corbett, Edward P.J. Classical Rhetoric for the Modern Student. Oxford University Press, New York, 1971.
 
 Toswell, M. J. “Polyptoton in Old English Texts.” Early English Poetic Culture and Meter: The Influence of G. R. Russom, edited by M. J. Toswell and Lindy Brady, pp. 111–130. Medieval Institute Publications, Kalamazoo, 2016.  JSTOR, www.jstor.org/stable/j.ctvvnccj.11.

Rhetoric
Figures of speech